Mario Mathieu (19 January 1917 – 24 November 1999) was an Argentine cyclist. He competed in the individual and team road race events at the 1948 Summer Olympics.

References

External links
 

1917 births
1999 deaths
Argentine male cyclists
Olympic cyclists of Argentina
Cyclists at the 1948 Summer Olympics
Sportspeople from Entre Ríos Province